The Guantanamo Bay Museum of Art and History is a fictional museum created by the American artist Ian Alan Paul. The museum exists virtually as a website and is also installed in real-world galleries in a series of satellite exhibitions. The museum claims to be based in Guantanamo Bay, Cuba at the site of the former Guantanamo Bay Detention Camp which according to the museum's history has been closed since 2012 when the museum was built to replace it.

The museum hosts artists works in its collection which reflect on and critique the Guantanamo Bay Detention Facility, contains a center for critical studies which collects texts about Guantanamo Bay including essays from Judith Butler and Derek Gregory, and runs an artist in residency program that produces new works for exhibitions. The museum is also listed as a real place on Google Maps just north of the detention facility.

History

When the fictional museum was first made public it was covered by a variety of international publications including by the Agence France-Presse, Studio Magazine, and the Atlantic. The Atlantic described the museum in this way after its opening:

After the project's launch, Ian Alan Paul has given lectures and talks at universities, museums, and conferences as the head curator and creator of the museum, and the artworks from the museum are shown in galleries as an extension and elaboration of the project's fiction.

References

Fictional museums
Virtual art museums and galleries
Guantanamo Bay
Alternate history websites
Museums established in 2012